Antaeotricha semicinerea is a moth in the family Depressariidae. It was described by Philipp Christoph Zeller in 1877. It is found in Panama, Guatemala and Brazil (Amazonas).

The wingspan is about 25 mm. The forewings are dull white, the dorsal half irregularly suffused light ochreous-grey, more narrowly posteriorly but on the termen extended as a narrow suffusion to the apex. The subbasal tuft of the dorsum is tinged ferruginous posteriorly and there is a small darker grey spot on the middle of the dorsum, as well as a transverse nearly interrupted dark grey dot on the end of the cell, resting on the greyish area, which is cut beneath it by an indistinct oblique whitish line, followed by some darker grey suffusion. A greyish shade is found from the costa before two-thirds to the tornus, pale towards the costa and interrupted above the middle, rather curved on the lower portion, this and terminal extension somewhat darker-barred. There is a dark grey marginal dot just above the apex. The hindwings are light grey with a strong grey subcostal tuft from the base reaching to beyond the middle, lying beneath the forewings, the basal half of the wing expanded beneath this with a broad strong projection of grey scales.

References

Moths described in 1877
semicinerea
Moths of Central America
Moths of South America